Baile ("dance" in Spanish) may refer to:

 Baile (Spanish play), a Spanish dramatic form
 Baile funk, a type of dance music from Rio de Janeiro
 Baile, the Irish Gaelic word for a town, usually anglicized as "bally" or "balla"
 Baile, the Scottish Gaelic word for a crofting township; see Township (Scotland)
 Băile (disambiguation), several places in Romania